Flow Science, Inc. is a developer of software for computational fluid dynamics, also known as CFD, a branch of fluid mechanics that uses numerical methods and algorithms to solve and analyze problems that involve fluid flows.

History

The firm was founded by Dr. C. W. "Tony" Hirt, previously a scientist at   Los Alamos National Laboratory (LANL). Hirt is known for having pioneered the volume of fluid method (VOF) for tracking and locating the free surface or fluid-fluid interface. T Hirt left LANL and founded Flow Science in 1980 to develop CFD software for industrial and scientific applications using the VOF method . 
   
The company is located in Santa Fe, New Mexico. The company opened an office in Japan in June 2011, and an office in Germany in 2012.

In December 2021 the holding company Dr. Flender Holding GmbH, of Aachen, Germany, acquired 100% of Flow Science Inc. shares.

Products

The company's products include FLOW-3D, a CFD software analyzing various physical flow processes; FLOW-3D CAST, a software product for metal casting users; FLOW-3D AM, a software product for simulating additive manufacturing and laser welding processes; FLOW-3D HYDRO, a software product for civil, environmental, and coastal engineers; FLOW-3D CLOUD, a cloud computing service installed on Penguin Computing On Demand (POD); FLOW-3D POST, a post-processing software built on ParaView; and FLOW-3D (x), an optimization and workflow automation software. There are high-performance computing (HPC) versions of both FLOW-3D and FLOW-3D CAST. FLOW-3D software uses a fractional areas/volumes approach called FAVOR for defining problem geometry, and a free-gridding technique for mesh generation.

Desktop Engineering Magazine, in a review of FLOW-3D Version 10.0, said: “Key enhancements include fluid structure interaction (FSI) and thermal stress evolution (TSE) models that use a combination of conforming finite-element and structured finite-difference meshes. You use these to simulate and analyze the deformations of solid components as well as solidified fluid regions and resulting stresses in response to pressure forces and thermal gradients.”

Key improvements of FLOW-3D Version 11.0 included increased meshing capabilities, solution sub-domains, an improved core gas model and improved surface tension model. FLOW-3D v11.0 also included a new visualization tool, FlowSight. Key improvements of FLOW-3D Version 12.0 included a visual overhaul of the GUI, an immersed boundary method, sludge settling model, a 2-fluid 2-temperature model, and a steady-state accelerator.

Applications

Blue Hill Hydraulics used FLOW-3D software to update the design of a fish ladder on Mt. Desert Island, Maine, that helps alewife migrate to the fresh water spawning habitat. T.

The FLOW-3D simulation demonstrated that problem could be solved by increasing the height of the wing walls by exactly one foot.

Researchers from the CAST Cooperative Research Centre and M. Murray Associates developed flow and thermal control methods for the high pressure die casting of thin-walled aluminum components with thicknesses of less than 1 mm. FLOW-3D simulation predicted the complex structure of the metal flow in the die and subsequent casting solidification.

Researchers at DuPont used FLOW-3D to optimize coating processes for a solution-coated active-matrix organic light-emitting diode (AMOLED) display technology.

Eastman Kodak Company researchers rapidly developed an inkjet printer technology using  FLOW 3-D simulation technology for predicting the performance of printhead designs .

A research team composed of members from Auburn University, Lamar University and RJR Engineering used Flow Science’s TruVOF method as a virtual laboratory to evaluate performance of highway pavement and drainage inlets with different geometries.

Researchers at Albany Chicago LLC and the University of Wisconsin – Milwaukee used FLOW-3D in conjunction with a one-dimensional algorithm to analyze the slow-shot and fast-shot die casting processes in order to reduce the number of iterations required to achieve desired process parameters.

References

Companies based in Santa Fe, New Mexico
Computational fluid dynamics
Software companies based in New Mexico
Software companies of the United States